Neven Vukman (born 11 April 1985) is a Croatian football midfielder, who is currently playing for hometown club Ivančica.

Club career
A product of the NK Varteks youth academy (a club which folded in 2015, and is not associated with his 2019 club), he made his debut for the first team in 2002. He remained in the club for the following 7 seasons, showing great promise, playing for the U21 national team and debuting for the A national team, but was plagued by injuries, which made him miss the entire 2007/2008 season. In January 2009 he went for a try out with Inter Turku in Finland, but returned to Varteks and remained until the summer of 2009, when he moved to newly promoted NK Karlovac. In the summer of 2010 he was transferred to NK Rijeka.

In 2016, after a series of seasons with Taraz, Varaždin, Zelina and Istra 1961, Vukman joined the new NK Varteks, which is located in the same city and stadium (Stadion Varteks) as his original youth club of the same name.

Vukman moved to Germany's Allerheiligen, and later a team in Greinbach, Austria, before returning to the Varteks in 2019.

International career
Vukman made his international debut against South Korea in the 2–0 friendly tournament loss in Hong Kong on 29 January 2006. He has made two appearances for the Croatia national football team, his final international was three days after his debut against hosts Hong Kong.

References

External links
 

1985 births
Living people
Sportspeople from Varaždin
Association football midfielders
Croatian footballers
Croatia under-21 international footballers
Croatia international footballers
NK Varaždin players
NK Karlovac players
HNK Rijeka players
FC Taraz players
NK Zelina players
NK Istra 1961 players
Croatian Football League players
Kazakhstan Premier League players
Second Football League (Croatia) players
First Football League (Croatia) players
Austrian Regionalliga players
Austrian 2. Landesliga players
Croatian expatriate footballers
Expatriate footballers in Kazakhstan
Croatian expatriate sportspeople in Kazakhstan
Expatriate footballers in Austria
Croatian expatriate sportspeople in Austria